Leandra is a feminine form of the Greek name Leander. It is in use in Italian, Portuguese and Spanish and was among the top 10 most popular names for newborn girls in Albania in recent years.

References 

 Feminine given names